Pietro Pellegri (born 17 March 2001) is an Italian professional footballer who plays as a striker for Serie A club Torino and the Italy national team.

In 2016, at the age of 15 years and 280 days, Pellegri joined Amedeo Amadei as the joint-youngest player to appear in Serie A. It was surpassed by Wisdom Amey in May 2021 at the age of 15 years and 274 days.

Club career

Genoa
Born in Genoa, Pellegri is a youth product of the Genoa youth academy. On 22 December 2016, he made his debut with the senior team in Serie A in a 1–0 away loss against Torino, coming on as an 88th-minute substitute for Tomás Rincón. At the age of 15 years and 280 days, he equalled the record as the youngest ever Serie A debutant, held by Roma's Amedeo Amadei since 1937 (Wisdom Amey would later surpass this record on his debut for Bologna in 2021). In doing so he also became the first player born in the 21st century to appear in Serie A, and the second player born in the 2000s to make his Italian top-flight debut after Moise Kean. On 28 May, he scored his first Serie A goal in a 3–2 away loss against Roma, becoming the first player born in the 21st century to ever score in Serie A, and the third youngest goalscorer ever in the Italian top flight, after Amadei and Gianni Rivera.

On 17 September 2017, he became the first 16-year-old to score twice in a single major European league game in a 3–2 home loss to Lazio; his brace also made him the youngest player ever in Serie A to have managed to do so.

Monaco
On 27 January 2018, Pellegri signed with Monaco for a reported fee of €25 million, the second largest transfer fee for a 16-year-old.
He made his Monaco debut on 16 February in a 4–0 home win against Dijon in Ligue 1, coming on for the final four minutes in place of Keita Baldé. At 16 years, 10 months and 30 days, he became the youngest league player in the club's history, breaking Kylian Mbappé's record by eleven days and receiving congratulations from the French forward.

On 26 August, he scored his first goal for Monaco to equalise in a 2–1 loss at Bordeaux. As a result, he became the first player born in the 21st century to score in France's top division.

Loan to AC Milan 
On 25 August 2021, AC Milan announced the signing of Pellegri from Monaco on a temporary loan basis, with the option to make the deal permanent, which becomes an obligation if certain conditions are met.

After making only six appearances with the first team, AC Milan terminated the loan deal on 27 January 2022.

Torino

Loan to Torino 
On 27 January 2022, Torino signed Pellegri on loan from AS Monaco, with an option to buy.

Move to Torino 
On 28 June 2022, Torino signed Pellegri on a permanent deal.

International career
With the Italy under-17 team, Pellegri took part at the 2017 UEFA European Under-17 Championship, scoring once.

He was given his first senior international call-up for Italy in September 2018, by manager Roberto Mancini, for Italy's opening UEFA Nations League matches against Poland and Portugal later that month. He missed the matches through a minor injury.

Pellegri made his senior debut for Italy on 11 November 2020, aged 19, featuring as a substitute in a friendly match won 4–0 against Estonia in Florence.

Personal life
Pellegri is the son of Genoa assistant manager and team administrator Marco Pellegri. He said that his idol and main influence is Zlatan Ibrahimović, whom he hailed as the best striker in the world.

Career statistics

Club

International

Notes

References

External links
Monaco profile

2001 births
Living people
Italian footballers
Italy youth international footballers
Italy international footballers
Genoa C.F.C. players
AS Monaco FC players
A.C. Milan players
Torino F.C. players
Association football forwards
Serie A players
Ligue 1 players
Championnat National 2 players
Italian expatriate footballers
Expatriate footballers in Monaco
Italian expatriate sportspeople in Monaco